The 1945–46 Istanbul Football League season was the 38th season of the league. Beşiktaş J.K. won the league for the 9th time. Beşiktaş JK, Fenerbahçe SK, İstanbulspor, and Galatasaray SK qualified for the National League.

League table

References

Istanbul Football League seasons
Turkey
2